The Vasil Levski National Military University is Bulgaria's national military academy.

History
Founded in 1878 as a military school in Plovdiv, it was moved to Sofia the same year. On 19 April 1924, it was promoted to university status; in 1945 it was named in honour of Bulgarian national hero Vasil Levski (1837–1873). Since 1958, it has been headquartered in Veliko Tarnovo.

On 14 June 2002, the structure of Bulgarian military academies was reorganized: the Veliko Tarnovo-based Vasil Levski National Military University also covers the artillery academy (now a faculty) in Shumen and the air force faculty in Dolna Mitropoliya. (The Georgi Rakovski Military Academy, which functions as a staff college, remains independent.)

External links
 Official website 

Military academies of Bulgaria
1878 establishments in Bulgaria
Universities in Veliko Tarnovo